The B.S. Ricks Memorial Library is a historic library in Yazoo City, Mississippi. It was added to the National Register of Historic Places on September 18, 1975. It is located at 310 North Main Street. The library was founded in 1838 as a membership library. In 1900 Fannie Ricks helped fund construction of the B. S. Ricks Memorial Library building, named after her late husband General B.S. Ricks. It opened in 1901 and had its formal dedication on January 1, 1902. It remains in use.

It is located at coordinates: 32°50′55″N 90°24′43″W / 32.848611°N 90.411944°W / 32.848611; -90.411944

See also
National Register of Historic Places listings in Yazoo County, Mississippi

References

Beaux-Arts architecture in Mississippi
Libraries on the National Register of Historic Places in Mississippi
Library buildings completed in 1901
National Register of Historic Places in Yazoo County, Mississippi